Flat Top Mountain is a summit in the U.S. state of Georgia.

Flat Top Mountain was descriptively named on account of its flat peak.

References

Landforms of Fannin County, Georgia
Landforms of Gilmer County, Georgia
Mountains of Georgia (U.S. state)